Yengejeh (also known as Engija, Engijeh, and Yengījeh) is a village in Yengejeh Rural District, Howmeh District, Azarshahr County, East Azerbaijan Province, Iran. At the 2006 census, its population was 2,190, in 599 families.

References 

Populated places in Azarshahr County